The Große Röder is a river of Saxony and Brandenburg, eastern Germany. It is a left tributary of the river Black Elster. It flows in a generally northwestern direction, through the towns Radeberg, Radeburg and Großenhain. It joins the Black Elster in the village  (a part of Röderland), west of Elsterwerda.

See also
List of rivers of Brandenburg
List of rivers of Saxony

Rivers of Brandenburg
Rivers of Saxony
Rivers of Germany